Socialist Unity may refer to:
 Socialist Unity (Italy), a social-democratic alliance of parties which contested the 1948 Italian general election
 Socialist Unity (Spain), a defunct electoral alliance which contested the 1977 Spanish general election
 Socialist Unity (UK), a defunct electoral coalition formed by the International Marxist Group
 Socialist Unity (United States), a Trotskyist group
 Socialist Green Unity Coalition, an electoral alliance which stood candidates in the 2005 UK general election as Socialist Unity

See also
 Socialist Unity Network
 Socialist Unity Party (disambiguation)